Ridgedale is an unincorporated community in southern Taney County, Missouri, United States. It lies approximately ten miles south of Branson on U.S. Route 65, about one-half mile north of the Arkansas state line. The community is part of the Branson, Missouri Micropolitan Statistical Area.

Ridgedale first had a post office in 1912, which closed the same year, and reopened in 1933, since which time it has remained open continuously.  The ZIP Code for Ridgedale is 65739.

References

Unincorporated communities in Taney County, Missouri
Branson, Missouri micropolitan area
Unincorporated communities in Missouri